No Nations, No Peoples is the eighth album from Arthur Loves Plastic and was released in 2002. In 2005, No Nations, No Peoples was reissued on Bev Stanton's own Machine Heart Music label.

Release notes
"Have those subway rides beneath federal buildings on high-alert days cramped your style? Don't despair! Join ALP in trippy tributes to better living through stimulants and downtempo missives against globalization."

Track listing

Personnel 
 Recorded by Bev Stanton in the Flamingo Room, Silver Spring, MD.
 Mastered by Bill Wolf, Wolf Productions, Alexandria, VA.

Additional musicians 
 Daryl Westfall - Loops (2) *
 Chris Phinney - Loops (3) *
 Lisa Moscatiello - Vocals (4, 8)
 Windlestraw - Loops (5) *
 International Garbageman - Loops (6) *
 Ciyd - Loops (9, 10) *
 Melody Whore - Loops (12) *
 Margie Perez - Vocals (14)

* Remixed for The Tapegerm Collective

Samples 
 Dialogue from the film Willy Wonka & the Chocolate Factory (3)
 Dialogue from the film Network (7)

Credits 
 Album cover designed by Scot Howard, The Digital Butterfly Project

References 

Arthur Loves Plastic albums
2002 albums